Miyanganj, also spelled Mianganj, is a village and corresponding community development block in Hasanganj tehsil of Unnao district, Uttar Pradesh, India. It is located on the road from Lucknow to Bangarmau, just to the west of the crossroads with another route linking Unnao and Sandila.

Miyanganj hosts a cattle fair on Asadha Badi 2-30. Vendors bring wooden products, agricultural implements, sweets, toys, and assorted other merchandise to sell at the event. The village also hosts a market on Wednesdays and Saturdays where grain and vegetables are sold. As of 2011, its population is 8,948, in 1,575 households.

History 
Formerly a village called Bhopatpur, the modern settlement of Miyanganj was founded in 1771 by Miyan Almas Ali Khan, a eunuch and finance minister under the Nawabs of Awadh. It was described in 1803 as a prosperous town, but then in 1823 a visitor described it as rapidly becoming dilapidated. It was later the site of a battle during the Indian Rebellion of 1857.

At the turn of the 20th century, Miyanganj had 13 mosques, 4 temples, two sarais, and one primary school with 33 students. The population in 1901 was 3,395 residents, including 1,312 Muslims, an especially high proportion for this part of Awadh.

The 1961 census recorded Miyanganj (here spelled "Miaganj") as comprising 3 hamlets, with a total population of 2,885 (1,503 male and 1,382 female), in 511 households and 493 physical houses. The area of the village was given as 836 acres. Average attendance of the cattle fair was about 4,000 people, and attendance of biweekly market averaged about 800. The V.D.T. Higher Secondary School in Miyanganj, founded in 1950, was in 1961 recorded as having a faculty of 10 teachers (all male) and a student body of 284 (also all male).

Villages 
Miyanganj CD block has the following 140 villages:

References

Villages in Unnao district